The Supreme Court Building is the official and principal site for the Supreme Court of Pakistan, located on the Constitution Avenue in Islamabad, Pakistan. Completed in 1993, it is flanked by the Prime Minister's Office to the south and the Presidential House and the Parliament House to the north.

Designed by famous Japanese architect, Kenzō Tange, under the consultation of the EPA, the complex was engineered and built by the CDA Engineering and Siemens Engineering. The building was part of an effort by the government of Pakistan to incorporate modernism into the architecture of important government buildings, for which several world-renowned architects were invited; Tange, after initially rejecting the invitation, ultimately agreed to participate.

Gallery

References

External links
Supreme Court building

Buildings and structures in Islamabad

Government buildings in Pakistan
Modernist architecture
Tourist attractions in Islamabad
National supreme court buildings
Kenzo Tange buildings
Government buildings completed in 1993